The Watagan Mountains or Watagans or Wattagan Mountains, a mountain range that is part of the Great Dividing Range, is located on the Lower Hunter region of New South Wales, Australia. The range is situated between the Upper Hunter River catchment and the Tuggerah Lakes with close proximity to Lake Macquarie.

The Watagans are covered with tall eucalyptus forest and rainforest. There are several camping areas and four wheel drive roads. Visitors should be careful as some areas can be quite steep and remote, with risky areas of near wilderness.

See also

 List of mountain ranges in New South Wales

References 

Mountain ranges of New South Wales
Climbing areas of Australia